Nicklas Kulti was the defending champion, but lost in the first round this year.

Goran Ivanišević defeated Christian Bergström 1–6, 7–6(7–5), 6–4 to secure the singles title of the 1992 Australian Men's Hardcourt Championships tennis tournament.

Seeds

  Goran Ivanišević (champion)
  Jan Siemerink (first round)
  Javier Sánchez (first round)
  Horst Skoff (second round)
  Thomas Muster (first round)
  Carl-Uwe Steeb (semifinals)
  Olivier Delaître (quarterfinals)
  Cristiano Caratti (first round)

Draw

Finals

Top half

Bottom half

External links
1992 Australian Men's Hardcourt Championships Draw

Singles